St. Mark's Coptic Orthodox Church is the first Coptic parish that was built and established in the district of Heliopolis in Cairo, Egypt. Being one of several Coptic Orthodox Churches in Heliopolis, St. Mark's Church is specifically located on Cleopatra Street, near the Cleopatra Hospital.

Early history

Establishment 

The idea of establishing a church in Heliopolis started out in 1917. A committee was formed, and eventually, the cornerstone was founded on Friday, June 16, 1922, under the papacy of Pope Cyril V. Prayers were held in a temporary location and started in January 1925. This was the case until 1930, when the construction was finally complete. The late Fr. Ibrahim Luke served as the first priest, and was at St. Mark's Church until he died in 1950. Today, there are nineteen priests that serve Saint Mark's Church alone.

Endowment lands 
Some of the adjacent land was purchased in 1948 to build the church hall and chapel. It was opened by Pope Cyril VI on June 5, 1964, and the new altar was consecrated, bearing the name of Saint Menas.

Coptic TV 
Father Daoud Lamei is a Coptic leader who has inspired others. He is married. He has been serving at St. Mark's Church in Heliopolis since he was sixteen years old. He is a prolific producer of videos and books of Coptic Orthodox teachings, and his sermons are presented on Coptic Television channels and online, on YouTube and other sites.

Papal visits 
As Saint Mark's Church has had a long history, there were several occasions upon which there were Papal visits made by different Coptic Popes. Among them are:
 Pope Joseph II: laid the cornerstone of the church hall.
 Pope Cyril VI: in 1960 for prayer and in 1964 for the opening of the church hall.
 Pope Shenouda III: visited several times; in 1973 and 1981 for preaching, as well a more recent visit in 2000, commemorating the 50th anniversary of Fr. Ibrahim Luke's departure.

See also 
 Christian Egypt
 List of Coptic Orthodox churches in Egypt

References

External links 

 
 The official website of St. Luke's Church
 Fr Daoud Lamei Sermons

Coptic Orthodox churches in Cairo
Coptic history
Coptic architecture
Oriental Orthodox congregations established in the 20th century
Churches completed in 1930
Church buildings with domes
20th-century Oriental Orthodox church buildings
20th-century churches in Egypt